The 1st European Cross Country Championships were held at Alnwick in England on 10 December 1994. Paulo Guerra took the title in the men's competition and Catherina McKiernan won the women's race.

Results

Men individual 9.5 km

Total 103 competitors

Men teams

Total 21 teams

Women individual 4.5 km

Total 77 competitors

Women teams

Total 17 teams

References

External links 
 European Athletic Association

Alnwick
European Cross Country Championships
European Cross Country Championships
European Cross Country Championships
International athletics competitions hosted by England
Cross country running in the United Kingdom
European Cross Country Championships